Starkey Township was a township in Logan County, North Dakota, United States. The former township was merged into the West Logan Unorganized Territory.

The township was located in the western part of the county and it bordered the following other townships within Logan County:
 Bryant Township (defunct) — north
 Dixon Unorganized Territory (defunct, formerly Dixon Township) — northeast corner
 Red Lake Township — east

References

Defunct townships in North Dakota
Populated places in Logan County, North Dakota